WGY-FM (103.1 MHz) is a news-talk radio station licensed to Albany, New York.  The station broadcasts 24 hours a day at 5,600 watts ERP from a non-directional antenna in North Greenbush, New York located near U.S. Route 4. The station, owned by iHeartMedia, serves the New York's Capital District and surrounding areas, including the portions of the Mid-Hudson and upper Hudson Valley.

WGY-FM's signal can be heard as far away as Hudson and Catskill to the south, Pittsfield and North Adams to the east, Warrensburg and Glens Falls to the north, and Amsterdam and Cobleskill to the west.

History

Easy listening
WGY-FM first signed on in 1966 with an easy listening format under the moniker Whirl and the call letters WHRL. The easy listening format lasted in some form or another for much of the next two decades, evolving to a soft adult contemporary approach in 1987. Listeners of the station prior to 1987 recall WHRL being an "elevator music" station.

"Today's Jazz" 103.1 FM WHRL 

103.1 FM WHRL was an adult contemporary/smooth jazz radio station from 1987 to October 1999. In 1988, the station flipped to a new age/jazz format, and became known as "Easy 103.1" and "The Breeze".  Around 1995, WHRL officially picked up the all-smooth jazz format. WHRL enjoyed success in its format. Radio & Records reported on WHRL's "net gains" success on August 25, 1995, noting "WHRL/Albany climbed from about a half share to over two in the same demo for a 214% increase." Similarly, in 1997, Radio & Records reported that "WHRL surged 2.5-3.4 12+." Before transitioning to all-smooth jazz, WHRL had played operas on the weekend and big band, only playing smooth jazz on the morning drive, but these were scrapped and WHRL added dayparts, or segments during the day, of smooth jazz. The change was well received. Brant Curtiss, the Operations Manager at the time said that "listener reaction, via phones and e-mail, has been extremely positive. WHRL went from two or three daily complaints (some urging them to convert more quickly) to a over dozen listeners each day asking for title and album information of the new music they had begun playing. Smooth jazz is not just wallpaper music in Albany."

At this time, the new smooth jazz format was marketed with word-of-mouth because there was not the kind of budget for massive television and print like jazz stations in larger markets could afford. In this effort, WHRL launched its website in 1997, as well as a "Jazz Club" that listeners could join. In going through this change to all-smooth jazz, WHRL more than doubled its cume (cumulative audience) from 1996 to 1997.

In its tenure, WHRL went by "Easy 103.1," "The Breeze" and "Today's Jazz." The station's "Today's Jazz" iteration logo had 103.1 on top of "TODAY'S JAZZ" written in a stylized font, above the station number which appeared on the bottom.

Today's Jazz used clips from Spyro Gyra's "Morning Dance" and Rick Braun's "Club Harlem" featuring Peter White as bumpers.

WHRL aimed for "stress management" with its song list and format. In 1999, Brant Curtiss, then DJ, Station Programmer, and Director/Creative Services for WHRL described the station:

"Our ratings rise continuously through the day. During evenings with our Today's Jazz Tonight and Lights Out programs, the numbers go through the roof - No. 1 and 2 in certain demos - and we are kicking the hell out of 41 stations in Albany. That's because the format fits the function, and our function is stress management. When people leave work and are driving home, we're like a decompression chamber for them. It's sad, but our morning show is almost not a factor: middays are more like morning for us. That doesn't mean you should waste mornings; you've got to go after it. With great songs like "Urban Turban," Kombo and Brian Tarquin's "Darlin' Darlin' Baby," you can pump up your sound. They have very strong hooks. Songs that are very smooth complement them and offer balance."

Ownership and management 

Dame Media Inc. purchased WHRL, a 6,000-watt station, in 1996 from Regal Broadcasting, Inc. of Rensselaer. Dame Media paid $2.63 million. That year, Congress had enacted new ownership rules raising the limit in the market size of the Capital Region from four stations to seven. The enactment precipitated a seller's market. At the time of Dame Media's purchase, WHRL had a 1.7 percent share of listeners aged 12 and up putting it in 12th place in the area. In 1994, the station had a revenue of $500,000.

In 1997, Dame Media hired Peter Baumann as station manager of WHRL "Today's Jazz." Previously, Baumann had been director of sales for other Capital District Radio Stations WPYX and WTRY. Another Dame Media hire in that year was Brant Curtiss as operations manager for WHRL. Previously Curtiss had been production director of WTPA/WVNC in Harrisburg, Pennsylvania. Dame Media Inc. was acquired by Clear Channel Communications Inc. in 1998 for $85 million in stock and debt.

WHRL activities and promotions 

Today's Jazz produced its own smooth jazz compilations from time to time. In 1998 the station released a compilation album with nine tracks that was available retail at Hollywood Video and sold for $7.95. A portion of the proceeds from the purchase of the compilation benefited the Y-ME National Breast Cancer Organization. The track list included songs by Spyro Gyra, Diana Krall, George Benson, and Lee Ritenour.

The station published a newsletter called "WHRL Smooth Jazz Scene" that featured "the lowdown on upcoming events plus cool photos of your favorite WHRL personalities." The newsletter could be picked up in the Capitol region at over twenty retail locations.

In 1997, WHRL acquired a station van named "Miles" that had the 103.1 "Today's Jazz" logo emblazoned on the side.

1999 transfer of smooth jazz to 104.9 FM WZMR 
After Clear Channel Communications (now iHeartMedia) purchased Dame Media in 1999, WHRL's future became cloudy and rumors of a format change circulated. Clear Channel Communications decided to discontinue the smooth jazz programming on WHRL-FM in 1999. The decision was met with public outcry.

In response to the public support of WHRL-FM, Albany Broadcasting's (now Pamal Broadcasting) WZMR-FM Albany/Schenectady/Troy decided to pick up the discarded smooth jazz format. Albany Broadcasting's Vice President of Programming concurred.

Today's Jazz WHRL continued to sponsor and promote jazz in the Capital Region right up until its departure in October 1999; for example, WHRL sponsored A Night of Jazz at the New York State Museum on September 9, 1999, featuring a live performance by jazz guitarist Dwight Sills.

Smooth jazz exits 104.9 
In June 2003, 104.9 incorporated smooth jazz and R&B oldies as "104.9 Love FM" to reach a broader audience.  However, by 2005, smooth jazz had permanently been taken off the air; in January 2005, 104.9 FM was still playing Christmas music, until it switched to a simulcast of "Froggy Country 107.1" in Glens Falls.

Channel 103-1
The smooth jazz format on 103.1 gave way to the modern rock-formatted Channel 103.1 on October 2, 1999, two weeks after former sister station WQBK-FM (now owned by Townsquare Media) flipped from modern rock to active rock; the first song played by Channel 103-1 was "Driven to Tears" by The Police. Slogans used by the station included "Albany's New Music Alternative", "Albany's New Rock Alternative", and eventually "Where You Rock" during its active rock format.

In 2009, WHRL adopted Clear Channel's Premium Choice active rock format, becoming musically identical outside of morning drive to sister stations KBRU in Oklahoma City and KIOC in Beaumont. WHRL became the third active rock station in the Albany market in addition to competitors WZMR and WQBK-FM. During this period, the Albany market had the highest number of active rock stations for an American radio market, until WZMR flipped to country on February 26, 2010.

However, when WHRL flipped to active rock in 2009, the Clear Channel-Regent non-compete clause, which was previously used when WBZZ flipped from Hot AC to AC, was invoked (as WQBK-FM is an active rock station) and led to the eventual flip to a talk radio simulcast of WGY. WHRL had already been reporting as an active rock station on Mediabase since 2008; Mediabase is owned by the station's parent company, iHeartMedia.

Throughout its history as a rock format, the station was known for playing many alternative, punk, goth, emo, and metal bands and artists from about 1990 to the present, including Avenged Sevenfold, Disturbed, Korn, Linkin Park, Slipknot, and Atreyu. The station also held concerts known as the Channel 103-1 Big Day Out every summer until 2010, featuring modern and active rock artists.

WGY-FM
At 12:01 AM on September 20, 2010, after the song "New Divide" by Linkin Park, WHRL dropped its active rock format to simulcast sister station WGY, which runs a news-talk format; in addition, the station changed its callsign to the current WGY-FM.

With WHRL switching from modern rock to active rock in 2009, only to drop it in favor of the WGY simulcast one year later, this leaves WEQX as the only modern rock radio station remaining in the Albany market. Despite being a rimshot station, WEQX is reported by Mediabase and Nielsen BDS as an Albany station.

As of September 24, 2010, Channel 103.1's former website redirects to the website of sister station WPYX (PYX 106.5).

HD Radio operations
In 2005, WHRL upgraded to IBOC digital radio alongside the rest of Clear Channel's Albany stations. On August 17, 2006, WHRL began airing an HD2 channel with a "Classic Alternative" format. With WHRL dumping active rock for a WGY simulcast, the station's HD2 signal was changed from the classic alternative format to a simulcast of WOFX (Fox Sports 980) the same day.

Logos

References

External links

GY-FM
Radio stations established in 1966
IHeartMedia radio stations
1966 establishments in New York (state)
News and talk radio stations in the United States